Spetsteh LLC, based in Nizhny Novgorod, is a Russian manufacturer and marketer of specialized tracked and wheeled all terrain vehicles. Its vehicles are operated by companies and oil and gas companies, geologists, energy, hunters, herders, search and rescue services.

Models

Tracked two-part ATVs
 ТТС-3404-ПГ Ужгур (PG Uzhgur)
 TTC-3404-ps Uzhgur
 ТТС-3404-3 ГП Ужгур/ GP Uzhgur
 Hagglund BV-206
 ТТМ-4901ГР/GR
 ТТМ-4901ПС/4901PS

Tracked ATVs

 ЗВМ-2410/SBU-2410 Uhtysh 
 ЗВМ-2411П/SBU-2411P Uzola
 ЗВМ-2411Г/SBU-2411G Uzola
 SBU-2411GP
 SBU-2412GP
 ТТМ-3902ГР/TTM 3902GR
 ТТМ-3902ПС/TTM 3902PS
 TTC-34014 Vetluga
 TTC-34015 Vetluga

tracked chassis manufactured by GAZ 
 GAZ 34039-12
 GAZ 34039-13
 GAZ 34039-22
 GAS 34039-23
 GAS 34039-33
 GAZ 3409 BEAVER
 GAZ 34091

Wheeled ATVs
Transmash manufactured wheeled ATV's equipped with large high flotation tires
 ЗВМ-3966/SBU-3966 (based on the GAZ-66)
 ЗВМ-3908/SBU-3908 (based on the GAZ Sadko)
 Kержак 4×4/Kerzhak 4×4 (based on the GAZ Gazelle)
 Кержак 6×6/Kerzhak 6×6 (based a 6×6 conversion of the GAZ Gazelle)
 Кержак 4×4/Kerzhak 4×4 with AMAZONE ZA-M Fertilizer spreaders (based on the GAZ Gazelle chassis cab
 ТТС 8110 (a two wheeled trailer)

Issues
Such vehicles were also used by the South Sudanese's government forces and associated militia's offensive in April 2018, which enabled them to assault previously inaccessible marshlands and swamps. The offensive led to extensive human rights violations, which included gang rapes, summary execution, tortures and enslavement of civilians.

See also
 Trekol - another Russian large ATV manufacturer

References

External links
  SBU factory official website 
 Spetsteh official website
 Transmash website

Truck manufacturers of Russia
Car manufacturers of Russia
Manufacturing companies based in Nizhniy Novgorod